Carl Van Duyne (May 30, 1946 – February 28, 1983) was an American sailor. He won the ICSA Men's Singlehanded National Championship with the Princeton University sailing team in 1966, and competed in the Finn event at the 1968 Summer Olympics.

A resident of Millburn, New Jersey, Van Duyne attended Pingry School and Princeton University.

References

External links
 

1946 births
1983 deaths
American male sailors (sport)
Olympic sailors of the United States
People from Millburn, New Jersey
Pingry School alumni
Sailors at the 1968 Summer Olympics – Finn
Sportspeople from Newark, New Jersey
Princeton Tigers sailors